Castaldo is a surname. Notable people with the surname include:

Alfonso Castaldo (1890–1966), Italian Roman Catholic cardinal
Joseph Castaldo (1927–2000), American composer
Matteo Castaldo (born 1985), Italian rower
Michéal Castaldo (born 1962), Italian tenor, music producer and composer

See also 
Castaldi